Fiammetta Cicogna (born 17 May 1988, Milan) is an Italian television presenter, actress, and model.

In 2022, she launched a jewelry brand called Inbilico.

Life 
Daughter of a Milanese candle maker, she began studying piano at the age of three. She achieved popularity thanks to Gabriele Muccino, who selected her for a Telecom Italia commercial, in which she played the role of a keyboardist for the young pop group TBand, a group that later obtained a contract with Caterina Caselli's record label Sugar: in 2009 the band released, in the wake of the success achieved with the commercial, a single with the cover Con te partirò, which was followed by the song Sogni.

Her television debut was on 25 July 2009 at the participation in the Venice Music Awards on Rai 2 in the role of the correspondent for backstage connections, and then with the co-hosting, with Savino Zaba, of the spin-off Venice Music Awards Giovani. In the 2009-2010 season, she participated as a pianist in the Chiambretti Night, a program broadcast on Italia 1 from September 2009 to April 2010 in the late evening. In November 2009, when she posed for the cover photo shoot for the magazine Maxim, she was a student of modern letters at the Università Cattolica del Sacro Cuore, leaving study of the law.

Filmography 
The Dove and the Serpent – short film (2011)
Tutta colpa di Freud (2014)
Sapore di te (2014)
On Air - Storia di un successo (2016)
In vacanza su Marte (2020)

Television 
Venice Music Awards Giovani (2009)
Chiambretti Night (2009-2010)
Wild - Oltrenatura (2009-2015)
Tamarreide (2011)
Takeshi's Castle (2011-2014)
Colorado - 'Sto classico (2012)
Celebrity Games (2012)
Forever Together Summer Show (2013)
Colorado ... a rotazione! (2013)
Tamarreide, director's cut (2013)
Made In Italy (2019)

References 

Living people
1988 births
Italian television presenters
Italian women television presenters
Italian female models
Mass media people from Milan
Università Cattolica del Sacro Cuore alumni
Models from Milan
Italian film actresses
Italian stage actresses
Italian television actresses
21st-century Italian actresses